Ben and Kate is an American single-camera sitcom television series that ran on Fox from September 25, 2012, to January 22, 2013, as part of the 2012–13 television season. The show was produced by 20th Century Fox Television and Chernin Entertainment. The show was created by Dana Fox who served as an executive producer alongside Peter Chernin, Katherine Pope, and Jake Kasdan.

Synopsis
The series focuses on a brother and sister who at first seem to be exact opposites: Ben is an over-the-top dreamer and professional underachiever, while younger sister Kate is a more practical single mother working as a bar manager. After visiting their home in Los Angeles, Ben realizes that his sister needs help with her life and taking care of her six-year-old daughter, Maddie. Because of this, he moves in with Kate so he can discover some of the things he has missed out on and Kate hopes to return the favor by bringing her brother back to reality. Along the way, they are surrounded by their close friends, B.J. and Tommy.

Cast and characters

Main
Dakota Johnson as Kate Fox, a neurotic and awkward yet earnest single mom who works as a bartender. Her college boyfriend broke up with her once she became pregnant with Maddie and she is since wary of the dating world.
Nat Faxon as Ben Fox, Kate's goofy older brother who moves into her house.  Despite being caught in a state of arrested development, Ben is very popular and protective of his family. He frequently tries his hand at inventing and entrepreneurship, though few attempts pan out.  His ideas include "Bunk Bed Pizza", which makes another friend rich, and, more recently, "Rail Mall", which he actually focuses on turning into a reality.
Lucy Punch as BJ (Beatrice Joan) Harrison, Kate's much more confident best friend and co-worker.  A vain hard partier, BJ is secretly married to Ben, despite the two sharing no feelings for each other. She often lectures Maddie at a level beyond her understanding. Although she has a British accent, she reveals she's actually from Texas.
Maggie Elizabeth Jones as Maddie Fox, Kate's 6-year-old daughter.
Echo Kellum as Tommy, Ben's charismatic best friend who works at a country club as a tennis instructor. In addition to sharing many of Ben's quirks, Tommy has been in love with Kate since high school. He is also a frequent collaborator on Ben's quirky schemes and business ideas.

Recurring
Geoff Stults as Will, a friendly single dad and neighbor who briefly dates Kate. Though they have chemistry, he becomes wary of her eccentric friends and family.
Rob Corddry as Buddy, the boorish owner of the bar where Kate and BJ work, also BJ's on-and-off boyfriend.
Brittany Snow as Lila, Tommy's girlfriend.
Melinda McGraw as Vera, a successful businesswoman who is physically attracted to Ben and helps his "Rail Mall" idea become an actual business.
Lauren Miller as Darcy, Ben's ex, whom he is still in love with when the series begins.
Luka Jones as Lance, a laid-back baker who begins to date Kate after she breaks up with Will.
Bruce McGill as Randy, Ben and Kate's negligent yet friendly father.

Production

Development
In October 2011, Fox bought the project, titled Ben Fox is My Manny, from creator Dana Fox. In January 2012, Fox ordered the show to pilot. The show was retitled to Ned Fox Is My Manny, then to The Kids, before finally being called Ben and Kate. On 9 May Fox ordered the show to series. On 14 May Neil Goldman and Garrett Donovan were announced as showrunners. On 11 September, it was announced that Goldman and Donovan had left the show. Goldman and Donovan cited creative differences as their reason for leaving. On October 8, 2012, Fox ordered a full season of 19 episodes of the series, that took the series beyond its initial 13 episode order. On 9 November it was announced that John Quaintance and David Feeney would become the new showrunners.

Casting
Maggie Elizabeth Jones was the first actor announced to have been cast, on February 1, 2012. On February 14, Echo Kellum was announced as Tommy, Ben's best friend. On February 23, Abby Elliott was announced to star as Kate Fox. On February 24, Lucy Punch was announced as BJ, Kate's best friend. On February 28, Nat Faxon was announced as Ben Fox.
Faxon was cast days after he won an Academy Award for co-writing The Descendants (2011). On March 20, it was announced that Elliott had been released from the show after the pilot's table read. Elliott was released because it was thought she was too young for the role. On March 21, it was announced that Austin Stowell would appear as a guest star in the role of Ryan, a character who Kate used to have a crush on and reunites with her for a date. It was reported that it would be a recurring role if the show was picked up. On 23 March, it was announced that Dakota Johnson would be replacing Elliott in the role of Kate Fox.

After the show was ordered to series, some recurring roles and guest appearances were announced. On August 14, Vernee Watson and Tom Wright were announced as Tommy's parents. On August 20, Rob Corddry was announced as Buddy, Kate's boss and BJ's boyfriend. On August 23, Lindsay Sloane was announced as Louise, an ex-girlfriend of Ben's who unexpectedly tracks him down. On September 5, Geoff Stults was announced as Will, a love interest for Kate. On November 5, Jane Seymour was announced as Wendy, BJ's mother. On November 9, Brittany Snow was announced as Lila, a love interest for Tommy. On January 10, 2013 Niecy Nash was announced as Roz, the wife of Buddy.

Cancellation
Despite the show's positive reviews, TV By the Numbers had Ben and Kate on its "likely to be cancelled" list, citing the show's disappointing 1.2 rating among 18- to 49-year-olds in an October 16 episode. The show faced stiff competition from CBS's NCIS, NBC's The Voice, and ABC's Dancing with the Stars.

On January 23, 2013, the show was pulled from the schedule. On January 25, Fox confirmed that the show had been cancelled. Of the six additional episodes ordered to take the show to a full season, only the first three had been filmed. The fourth had been shooting when the show was cancelled and would remain unfinished. Episodes 14, 15, and 16 have not yet been aired in the U.S. however were aired on March 11 and March 18 in the UK on ITV2. FOX stated that the completed three episodes would air in the future, though they did not give a date. As of October 2013, they have not aired but have been posted on online services such as iTunes and Amazon.com.

Episodes
There were 16 episodes in Ben and Kate's single season.

Broadcast
Ben and Kate premiered in Australia on October 8, 2012 on Network Ten. The show premiered in the United Kingdom January 7, 2013 on ITV2. In Canada, the program premiered on September 25, 2012 on City in a simulcast with the U.S. showing.

Reception
For the most part, Ben and Kate has been moderately received, obtaining a score of 67 out of 100 on Metacritic, indicating generally favorable reviews. On Rotten Tomatoes, the series has an aggregate score of 73% based on 29 positive and 11 negative critic reviews. The website’s consensus reads: " It may not be a laugh riot, but Ben and Kate sports a likable cast and just enough funny -- with a touch of charm -- to make it worth rooting for."

References

External links
 
 Ben and Kate at Facebook

2010s American single-camera sitcoms
2012 American television series debuts
2013 American television series endings
English-language television shows
Fox Broadcasting Company original programming
Television series about dysfunctional families
Television series by 20th Century Fox Television
Television series by Chernin Entertainment
Television series about siblings
Television shows set in Los Angeles